Dr. Daniel Nuñez del Prado (29 July 1840 in La Paz, Bolivia – 1891) was a revolutionary Bolivian doctor of medicine. His parents were Dr Maria José Nuñez del Prado and Isabel del Valle. His brother, Eduardo Nuñez del Prado, was also a doctor of medicine.

President Mariano Melgarejo expelled Nuñez del Prado from Bolivia.  The reason was that Rosa Zeballos Tomayo, the wife of Nuñez del Prado denied General Melgarejo access to her house during a parade. It is one of the historical buildings in the city of La Paz. Years later, Don Daniel urgently was requested to attend a patient who had been shot dead in Lima. The patient was General Melgarejo. The last confession from former president Melgarejo was that he was with Don Daniel Nuñez del Prado.

Timeline

Degree as doctor of medicine in Lima / 1863.
1866 Fights under supreme commander Jose Galvez against the Spanish invasion, obtaining decorations from the Peruvian and Bolivian governments.
1868 Combats a yellow fever epidemic in Lima, and so obtains a decoration from the Peruvian congress.
1878 Prefect of La Paz.
1881 Bolivian foreign minister under President Campero.

Works
Opusculo sobre la fiebre amarilla.

Achievements
 Dean of the Faculty of medicine in La Paz.
 Organizes the battalion "Victoria" to defend Bolivia from the attacks from Chile.  Due to this action he obtains the nomination as Colonel.

References

 Tras la huella de los hermanos Núñez del Prado at Archivos bolivianos de historia de la Medicina 
 http://www.histarmar.com.ar/InfHistorica/GuerraPacificoEspaniaChPeru/Pacifico1base.htm 

1840 births
1891 deaths
Bolivian physicians
People from La Paz
Bolivian expatriates in Peru
Foreign ministers of Bolivia
Bolivian diplomats